Condemned to Sin (German: Verdammt zur Sünde) is a 1964 West German drama film directed by Alfred Weidenmann and starring Martin Held, Hildegard Knef and Heidelinde Weis.

The film's sets were designed by the art director Hertha Hareiter. Location shooting took place in Austria at Rapottenstein Castle and around the city of Wels.

Plot 
Germany at the time of the economic miracle. Hugo Starosta, expelled from eastern Germany annexed by Poland after the Second World War, is one of the few who didn't make it through the years of reconstruction. Almost twenty years after the end of the war, he and his extended family still live in a fortress-like castle that is run by the state as a reception and refugee camp and has increasingly become a social housing project. The accommodation — a one-room emergency quarters for eight people from three generations — is run-down, poor and filthy, Starosta herself is work-shy and blabbering, imperious and sometimes choleric. His children know nothing but this misery and threaten to neglect themselves. One of his offspring becomes a father at the age of 15, another, actually a factory worker, secretly works as a prostitute. Aggression, outbreaks of violence and unrestrained lifestyles are the order of the day.  

While other camp residents strive to leave these degrading living conditions behind as quickly as possible, old Starosta has long since come to terms with these circumstances and even feels comfortable with it. He likes to mess with the authorities and eventually gets him and his clan allowed to stay while the other residents gradually evacuate the fortress. Starosta defends his miserable "paradise" with all consistency, he drives young intruders out of the little room — throwing things and giving out kicks. More and more, Hugo Starosta has become the patriarch of a family that has settled comfortably in the suspended precariat. Starosta proves to be a sullen bon vivant who only seems to take the initiative to escape from the prevailing conditions; for example, if he founds a kind of "transport company". However, his main day-to-day activity remains lounging around, making grand speeches and getting on the nerves of others.  

The other starostas and their personal environment also seem to spring from a panopticon of bizarre types; there is, for example, the elderly grandmother who simply does not want to die and complains about the coffin that she has already chosen and which she considers inferior. One of the Starosta sons, the shy Albert, has huge ears that determine all his thoughts and actions. Starosta's sister's boyfriend lives out his image as a chavish woman-pleaser, while the salesman, a gentle, modest man, represents the absolute antithesis to him. The two oldest Starosta sons have fled the fortress. Their names are Adolf and Hermann and they shed light on Hugo Starosta's political views up until 1945. Neighbor Alwine, as she says, "experienced certain things while fleeing" and hasn't really been interested in sex since then. Starosta's wife was also raped by Red Army soldiers, according to Hugo, but, according to Starosta, "it didn't bother him that much".

Cast
 Martin Held as Hugo Starosta
 Hildegard Knef as Alwine
 Heidelinde Weis as Edeltraut
 Tilla Durieux as Die Großmutter
 Else Knott as Eliese Starosta
 Christa Linder as Mi Mo, deren Tochter
 Hubert Suschka as Victor, Alwines Mann
 Michael Ande as Albert, Starostas Sohn
 Alice Treff as 	Die Leiske
 René Egiomue as Bruno, das Nesthäkchen
 Robert Graf as Der Vertreter
 Peter Vogel as Hans
 Gertraud Jesserer as Dora
 Alexander Braumueller as Johann, Kainraths Sohn
 Joseph Offenbach as Kainrath, Kantinenwirt
 Reinhard Glemnitz as 	Anstaltsleiter
 Thomas Danneberg as Adolf, Starostas Sohn	
 Franz Stoss as Direktor der Jugenderziehungsanstalt

References

Bibliography 
 Goble, Alan. The Complete Index to Literary Sources in Film. Walter de Gruyter, 1999.

External links 
 

1964 films
West German films
German drama films
1964 drama films
1960s German-language films
Films directed by Alfred Weidenmann
Films shot in Austria
1960s German films